In mathematics, a semigroup with two elements is a semigroup for which the cardinality of the underlying set is two. There are exactly five nonisomorphic semigroups having two elements:
 O2, the null semigroup of order two,
 LO2, the left zero semigroup of order two,
 RO2, the right zero semigroup of order two,
 ({0,1}, ∧) (where "∧" is the logical connective "and"), or equivalently the set {0,1} under multiplication: the only semilattice with two elements and the only non-null semigroup with zero of order two, also a monoid, and ultimately the two-element Boolean algebra, 
 (Z2, +2) (where Z2 = {0,1} and "+2" is "addition modulo 2"), or equivalently ({0,1}, ⊕) (where "⊕" is the logical connective "xor"), or equivalently the set {−1,1} under multiplication: the only group of order two. 
The semigroups LO2 and RO2 are antiisomorphic.

Determination of semigroups with two elements 
Choosing the set  as the underlying set having two elements, sixteen binary operations can be defined in A. These operations are shown in the table below. In the table, a matrix of the form

indicates a binary operation on A having the following Cayley table.

In this table:
The semigroup  denotes the two-element semigroup containing the zero element 0 and the unit element 1.  The two binary operations defined by matrices in a green background are associative and pairing either with A creates a semigroup isomorphic to the semigroup . Every element is idempotent in this semigroup, so it is a band. Furthermore, it is commutative (abelian) and thus a semilattice. The order induced is a linear order, and so it is in fact a lattice and it is also a distributive and complemented lattice, i.e. it is actually the two-element Boolean algebra.
The two binary operations defined by matrices in a blue background are associative and pairing either with A creates a semigroup isomorphic to the null semigroup O2 with two elements.
The  binary operation defined by the matrix in an orange background is associative and pairing it with A creates a semigroup. This is the left zero semigroup LO2. It is not commutative.
The binary operation defined by the matrix in a purple background is associative and pairing it with A creates a semigroup. This is the right zero semigroup RO2. It is also not commutative.
The two binary operations defined by matrices in a red background are associative and pairing either with A creates a semigroup isomorphic to the group .
The remaining eight binary operations defined by matrices in a white background are not associative and hence none of them create a semigroup when paired with A.

The two-element semigroup ({0,1}, ∧) 
The Cayley table for the semigroup ({0,1}) is given below:

This is the simplest non-trivial example of a semigroup that is not a group. This semigroup has an identity element, 1, making it a monoid. It is also commutative. It is not a group because the element 0 does not have an inverse, and is not even a cancellative semigroup because we cannot cancel the 0 in the equation 1·0 = 0·0.

This semigroup arises in various contexts. For instance, if we choose 1 to be the truth value "true" and 0 to be the truth value "false" and the operation to be the logical connective "and", we obtain this semigroup in logic. It is isomorphic to the monoid {0,1} under multiplication. It is also isomorphic to the semigroup

under matrix multiplication.

The two-element semigroup (Z2, +2) 
The Cayley table for the semigroup  is given below:

This group is isomorphic to the cyclic group Z2 and the symmetric group S2.

Semigroups of order 3 

Let A be the three-element set . Altogether, a total of 39 = 19683 different binary operations can be defined on A. 113 of the 19683 binary operations determine 24 nonisomorphic semigroups, or 18 non-equivalent semigroups (with equivalence being isomorphism or anti-isomorphism). 
 With the exception of the group with three elements, each of these has one (or more) of the above two-element semigroups as subsemigroups.

Finite semigroups of higher orders 
Algorithms and computer programs have been developed for determining nonisomorphic finite semigroups of a given order. These have been applied to determine the nonisomorphic semigroups of small order. The number of nonisomorphic semigroups with n elements, for n a nonnegative integer, is listed under  in the On-Line Encyclopedia of Integer Sequences.  lists the number of non-equivalent semigroups, and  the number of associative binary operations, out of a total of nn2, determining a semigroup.

See also 
 Empty semigroup
 Trivial semigroup (semigroup with one element)
 Semigroup with three elements
 Special classes of semigroups

References 

Algebraic structures
Semigroup theory